The Spanish National Dance Company (CND) was founded in 1979 under the name Ballet Nacional de España Clásico. Its first director was dancer Victor Ullate, followed by Maria de Avila, Ray Barra, Maya Plisetskaya, Nacho Duato (1990 – July 2010), Hervé Palito, José Carlos Martínez (December 2010 – 2019), and Joaquín de Luz.

In 2018 it was announced that the company would be moving to the railway museum, near the centre of Madrid.

References

External links
 
 Archival footage of Compania Nacional de Danza 2 performing Arenal in 2004 at Jacob's Pillow
 Archival footage of Compania Nacional de Danza 2 performing Gnawa in 2010 at Jacob's Pillow

Dance in Spain
Ballet companies in Spain
Performing groups established in 1979